Journal of Nanophotonics is a quartertly peer-reviewed scientific journal published by SPIE. It covers theoretical, computational and experimental aspects of nanophotonics and their applications. It began publication in 2007 with Akhlesh Lakhtakia of Pennsylvania State University as its editor-in-chief. In 2013,  Ali Adibi of Georgia Institute of Technology became its second editor-in-chief.

According to the Journal Citation Reports, the journal has a 2020 impact factor of 1.494.

References

External links

Optics journals
English-language journals
Quarterly journals
Publications established in 2007
Materials science journals
SPIE academic journals
Nanotechnology journals